The Miliband–Poulantzas debate was a debate between Marxist theorists Ralph Miliband and Nicos Poulantzas concerning the nature of the state in capitalist societies. Their exchange was published in New Left Review, beginning with Poulantzas's review of Miliband's 1969 work on bourgeois democracies, The State in Capitalist Society. The exchange is typically characterized as a debate between Miliband's instrumentalist model of the capitalist state and Poulantzas' structural position; however, Bob Jessop argues that this account is misleading.

Debate 
In The State in Capitalist Society, Miliband presents his theory of how the state functions to serve capitalist interests. It does so, he claims, because of (1) the social origins of members of the government and (2) the personal ties and influence between members of the government and ruling-class elites.

Poulantzas disagrees with Miliband's approach, adopting a structural position. He claims the state is objectively a capitalist entity, which can serve no purpose other than preserving the capitalist mode of production. Furthermore, he argues that if members of the ruling class are the same people as those who manage the state, this is merely a coincidence: the state reproduces capitalist relations regardless of who is in charge. In his critique, he claims: The relation between the bourgeois class and the state is an objective relation. This means that if the function of the state in a determinate social formation and the interests of the dominant class coincide, it is by reason of the system itself: the direct participation of members of the ruling class in the state apparatus is not the cause but the effect.

In a response to Poulantzas's criticisms, Miliband counters that Poulantzas's position allows no room for agency and is therefore too limiting. His point of view does not allow individuals to make decisions based on their own free will; rather, their decisions are determined solely by the structure of society: For what his exclusive stress on 'objective relations' suggests is that what the state does is in every particular and at all times wholly determined by these 'objective relations': in other words, that the structural constraints of the system are so absolutely compelling as to turn those who run the state into the merest functionaries and executants of policies imposed upon them by 'the system'.

See also 
 Marx's theory of the state
 Structure and agency
 State derivation

References

Bibliography

Further reading 

 

Marxist theory
Political debates
Philosophical debates